Hannes Wolf (born 16 April 1999) is an Austrian professional footballer who plays as a midfielder for Bundesliga club Borussia Mönchengladbach.

Club career

RB Leipzig
On 23 January 2019, Red Bull Salzburg announced that they had sold Wolf to RB Leipzig from the upcoming 2019/20 season. Wolf penned a 5-year contract with the club.

Short after his arrival to RB Leipzig, Wolf suffered a horrendous leg break for Austria U21 at the European Under-21 Championships in June 2019, after giving his side the lead in the 2–0 victory.

Borussia Mönchengladbach 
On 21 July 2020, Borussia Mönchengladbach announced the signing of Wolf on a loan deal from RB Leipzig until June 2021, with an option to buy at the end of the season. He will reunite with his former manager at Red Bull Salzburg, Marco Rose. In February 2021, the director of sports Max Eberl confirmed that the move was made permanent.

Swansea City (loan)
On 20 January 2022, Wolf joined EFL Championship club Swansea City on loan until the end of the season. He scored his first goal for the club in a 0-4 win as Swansea City completed the first ever League double in the South Wales derby over rivals Cardiff City.

International career
He was called up to the senior Austria squad for the UEFA Nations League matches against  Croatia, Denmark, France and Denmark on 3, 6, 10 and 13 June 2022.

Career statistics

Honours 
Red Bull Salzburg Youth
UEFA Youth League: 2016–17

Red Bull Salzburg
Austrian Bundesliga: 2017–18, 2018–19
Austrian Cup: 2018–19

References

External links

 
 Profile at ÖFB

1999 births
Living people
Footballers from Graz
Association football midfielders
Austrian footballers
Austria youth international footballers
Austria under-21 international footballers
Austrian Football Bundesliga players
2. Liga (Austria) players
Bundesliga players
English Football League players
FC Liefering players
FC Red Bull Salzburg players
RB Leipzig players
Borussia Mönchengladbach players
Swansea City A.F.C. players
Austrian expatriate footballers
Expatriate footballers in Germany
Austrian expatriate sportspeople in Germany
Expatriate footballers in Wales
Austrian expatriate sportspeople in Wales